Waterwalker is a 1984 documentary film by Bill Mason, a Canadian outdoorsman, painter, canoeist and environmentalist, who made many films on the art of canoeing and on the appreciation of nature.  Released theatrically in Canada in 1984, it was nominated for a Genie Award for "Best Documentary Feature."

The film follows Mason as he canoes through whitewater rapids and along the coast of Lake Superior. It features a musical score by Bruce Cockburn. It was Mason's last film.

References

External links

1984 films
English-language Canadian films
Canadian documentary films
National Film Board of Canada documentaries
Films directed by Bill Mason
Documentary films about canoeing
1984 documentary films
Films shot in Ontario
Films set in Ontario
1980s English-language films
1980s Canadian films